C.A.B. is a British television programme which was produced by Thames Television for Children's ITV. The drama revolved around Colin Freshwater (Felipe Izquierdo) and Franny Barnes (Louise Mason) and the strange happenings in their junk shop. The show ran for three series (with a total of 33 episodes), which were broadcast in the UK between 1986 and 1989.

Cast
Felipe Izquierdo - Colin Freshwater
Louise Mason - Franny Barnes
Frank Gatliff - Mr Hellman
Graham Seed - Smith
Lyndam Gregory - Anwar
Victor Maddern - Private Tripe
Joan Hooley - Umma
David Janes - Policeman
Keith Varnier - Nyegel
Ben Felton - Jace Freshwater
Tracey McDonald - Tracey Barnes
John Vine - Robert
Michael Bertenshaw - Vine
Judith Paris - Eleanor

External links

The C.A.B. H.Q. Website (Fan Website)
SausageNet C.A.B. Page

1986 British television series debuts
1989 British television series endings
ITV children's television shows
English-language television shows
Television series by Fremantle (company)
Television shows produced by Thames Television
1980s British children's television series